Yoo Ja Hyo (born 1947) is a South Korean broadcaster and poet.

Personal life

Yoo was born in Seoul on September 13, 1947, and graduated from Seoul National University.

Career

In 1968, his poetry was accepted for the New Year's Literature Prize of the Shin-a ilbo. In 1972, he made his debut in a poem titled 'wedding' in the Shijo munhak(A literary magazine in Korea). He served as director of SBS Radio. He is currently the director of the Society of Korean Poets and the president of the Jiyong Association (established in 1988 to honor the poet Jeong Jiyong).

Works
 outgoing (떠남; 1993)
 My soul is (내 영혼은; 1994)

Awards
 Jeong Jiyong Literature Prize (2005)

See also
Korean literature
List of Korean-language poets
Society of Korean Poets

References 

1947 births
Living people
20th-century South Korean poets
21st-century South Korean poets
South Korean male poets
Seoul National University alumni
20th-century male writers